Mityakino is a rural locality (a selo) in Rudnyanskoye Urban Settlement, Rudnyansky District, Volgograd Oblast, Russia. The population was 39 as of 2010.

Geography 
Mityakino is located in forest steppe, 21 km south of Rudnya (the district's administrative centre) by road. Beryozovka is the nearest rural locality.

References 

Rural localities in Rudnyansky District, Volgograd Oblast